Keytrade Bank is a financial services company based in Belgium with a subsidiary in Luxembourg.

History 
VMS-Keytrade, Belgium's first online investment site, was founded in 1998. In 2002, VMS-Keytrade became Keytrade Bank and acquired its banking status by taking over RealBank.

Between 2005 and 2016, Keytrade Bank was part of the Crelan Group, which until 2015 was 50% owned by the Crédit Agricole Group, one of Europe's largest groups (own funds of €64.8 billion and net profit of €6 billion).

Since June 2016, Keytrade Bank has been part of the Crédit Mutuel Arkéa banking group.

Products 
Keytrade Bank offers all banking and trading services online.

Bank 
Keytrade Bank offers all the usual services of a large bank with a current account, a savings account and a term account for free, but also debit and credit cards.

 Current account: available 24 hours a day, yielding 5 cents for each operation executed; Bancontact / Mister Cash / Maestro cards for free and VISA and American Express credit cards.
 Savings account: account with an interest rate of 0.05% a year + 0.20% fidelity premium.
 Term account: period of the term between 1 week and 1 year and with the possibility to break up the term or to extend the time.

Trading 
As a brokerage firm, Keytrade Bank offers access to several markets: Euronext Brussels, Paris and London Stock Exchange, Frankfurt (Xetra), Milan (Borsa Italiana), Switzerland (SWX et Virt-x), Madrid (Bolsa de Madrid), Amsterdam, the U.S. (Nyse, Nasdaq, Amex et OTC-BB) and Canada (TSX & TSX Venture).

Keytrade Bank presents a broad range of products for private investors: stocks, options, warrants, turbos, mutual funds, trackers, bonds, structured products...

Keytrade Bank also offers Keytrade Pro, a professional day-trading and trend trading platform for new products, which used to be accessible only to professional investors. This platform allows the investor to invest in: 
 The Forex (with 160 currency crosses)
 The Futures market with more than 400 available contracts in 15 markets 
 CFDs which allow investors to take position on more than 3500 underlying stocks on the 22 largest global markets with a leverage effect from 1 to 10.

Marketing

Keytrade Bank provides the numbers used in the daily financial magazine Cotes et Cours, which is broadcast by the RTBF. This partnership allows Keytrade Bank to run a short spot advertising just before and after the magazine. This seems like a win-win marketing operation for both the RTBF and Keytrade Bank.

On 29 September 2014, KeytradeBank Belgium established a brand new visual identity: a new logo, website and advertising campaign have been announced.

It seems this new visual identity has not yet made its way to the Keytrade Bank subsidiaries: Keytrade Bank Nederland, Keytrade Bank Lux and Strateo (Switzerland).

Slogans

 "To the daring" (Vive les audacieux) - from 1 September 2014.
 "L'évolution est en marche"
 "Quand on aime, on compte"

References

Banks established in 1998
Banks of Belgium
Financial services companies of Belgium
Companies based in Brussels
Crédit Mutuel